Tuoba Luguan (pinyin: Tuòbá Lùguān) (died 307), was chieftain of the Tuoba clan from 294 to 307. He was a son of Tuoba Liwei, the brother of Tuoba Shamohan, Tuoba Xilu, Tuoba Chuo. In 294, Tuoba Luguan became chieftain of the Tuoba upon the death of his nephew Tuoba Fu.

In 295, Tuoba Luguan divided the territory under Tuoba control into three areas: a vast tract of land extending west from White Mountain (northeast of Zhangjiakou) to Dai (Datong, Shanxi); an eastern area from Shengle (south of Hohhot) and beyond; a central area, which included north Shanxi and the region to its north. Tuoba Luguan remained in control of the eastern area. His nephews Tuoba Yilu and Tuoba Yituo were named chieftains of the western area and central areas, respectively.

References 

3rd-century births
307 deaths
3rd-century Chinese people
4th-century Chinese people
Northern Wei people
Year of birth unknown
Chieftains of the Tuoba clan